Micmacs is a 2009 French comedy film by French director Jean-Pierre Jeunet. Its original French title is MicMacs à tire-larigot (loosely "Non-stop shenanigans"). The film is billed as a "satire on the world arms trade". It premiered on 15 September 2009 at the 2009 Toronto International Film Festival as a gala screening at Roy Thomson Hall.

Plot
A young boy named Bazil loses his military father, who is blown up while attempting to defuse a land mine in the Western Sahara.  Thirty years later, Bazil (Dany Boon) is working in a video rental shop in Paris when a stray bullet from a shoot-out in the street enters his forehead.  Doctors save him but decide against removing the bullet, though it may kill him at any moment, for fear of damaging his brain further.  Bazil returns to his workplace to find that he has been replaced. As he leaves, his replacement gives him a shell casing that she found from the bullet that had struck him.

Bazil, who has miming and sign language talents, becomes a homeless busker until he is taken in by a man named Slammer (Jean-Pierre Marielle) to Tire-Larigots, a shelter carved under a mountain of recycling material.  Bazil is befriended by the other scavenging dwellers: Elastic Girl (Julie Ferrier), a contortionist, Mama Chow (Yolande Moreau), who feeds and mothers the crew, Remington (Omar Sy) a former ethnographer from Africa who speaks entirely in old-fashioned language clichés, Buster (Dominique Pinon), a former human cannonball, Tiny Pete (Michel Crémadès), an artist who designs moving sculptures from scavenged trash, and Calculator (Marie-Julie Baup), a young woman who measures and calculates things with a glance.  Slammer himself is a former convict who miraculously survived an execution by guillotine.

While scavenging for trash, Bazil discovers the offices and factories of the firms that manufactured the landmine that orphaned him and the bullet he was shot with, on opposite sides of a street. He enters the latter to ask for compensation but is thrown out violently on orders of CEO Nicolas Thibault de Fenouillet.  He then infiltrates the other company and manages to hear a speech by its CEO, François Marconi.

Bazil follows Marconi home and hangs a microphone down his chimney. He hears a phone conversation arranging a meeting between Marconi and associates of Omar Boulounga, an African dictator seeking arms for an upcoming violent conflict. Mama Chow demands to know what Bazil is up to and the crew decides to help him exact revenge on the two arms dealers. They first incapacitate Boulounga's men by planting drugs on them in an airport.

Remington, claiming to be Boulounga's right-hand man, meets with De Fenouillet and proposes the same deal which was offered to Marconi. Later, Remington calls each of Marconi and De Fennouillet and angrily cancels the deal. He tells Marconi that he will be dealing with De Fennouillet, and tells De Fennouillet that he will be dealing with Marconi. The two CEOs are furious and declare war on each other. Bazil and his friends break into Marconi's house and steal and replace his luxury cars, and steal De Fenouillet's collection of body-part relics from historical persons. They also steal and destroy a truck full of bombs from Marconi's plant. Marconi assumes that De Fennouillet is responsible, and arranges to sabotage a machine causing a massive explosion in De Fennouillet's factory. Next, Elastic Girl breaks into Marconi's apartment searching for blackmail material while Bazil waits and listens on the roof.

Marconi arrives unexpectedly, and Elastic Girl is forced to hide in the refrigerator. De Fenouillet sends an armed team to attack Marconi, but Boulounga's men arrive first and take him hostage. Boulounga's men are about to execute Marconi when they are shot by De Fennouillet's men.  De Fenouillet is, in turn, about to murder Marconi when a henchman captures Bazil on the roof and brings him down.  The two executives recognise him and figure out what has happened.  They decide to take Bazil to a safe house in order to question him.  Elastic Girl comes out of her hiding place, and calls in the rest of the crew to rescue Bazil. After a car chase through Paris, Bazil is saved and Marconi and De Fennouillet are captured. The two CEOs are bound and hooded, and they hear a long plane flight followed by a ride in a car. When they are allowed to see again, they are in the middle of the desert. In a scene inspired by Sergio Leone's Once Upon a Time in the West, De Fennouillet is sitting on Marconi's shoulders with a live grenade in his mouth, while Marconi stands on a live land mine. A small crowd wearing desert outfits sit watching them, holding photographs of landmine victims. The men beg for mercy and confess to supplying arms to the IRA, ETA, and Darfur combatants.

Marconi and De Fenouillet fall and discover that the grenade and mine are not armed. The small audience is revealed to be Bazil and his friends in disguise, who have been recording the event with a video camera. In a flashback inspired by Brian De Palma's Mission: Impossible, we see that Bazil and his friends simulated the entire plane flight with various sound effects, and the desert setting is simply a clearing in a Paris suburb. Bazil and Calculator upload their video to YouTube, and Marconi and De Fenouillet are publicly disgraced. Bazil and Elastic Girl become a couple.

Cast

 Dany Boon as Bazil
 Yolande Moreau as Mama Chow
 André Dussollier as Nicolas Thibault De Fenouillet
 Nicolas Marié as François Marconi
 Julie Ferrier as Elastic Girl
 Omar Sy as Remington
 Dominique Pinon as Buster
 Marie-Julie Baup as Calculator
 Michel Crémadès as Tiny Pete
 Jean-Pierre Marielle as Slammer
 Urbain Cancelier as Urbain

Production

Development
Jean-Pierre Jeunet originally wrote the character of Bazil for Jamel Debbouze, but Debbouze left the project after three weeks, citing artistic and financial disagreements. The role was later given to Dany Boon.

Jeunet toured arms manufacturing plants in Belgium for research when developing the film. Some dialogue was taken directly from interviews from arms dealers. The sabotaged machine in De Fenouillet's factory was modeled exactly after an actual machine in a plant which Jeunet visited.

Filming
The film was shot in several locations in and around Paris including the exterior of the Musée d'Orsay and the Crimée bridge on the Canal de l'Ourcq, where the Marcel Carné's 1946 film Gates of the Night was shot. Jeunet also filmed in several train stations, including Gare de Lyon, Gare Saint-Lazare, and the Charles De Gaulle airport train station.

Effects
Though the film contains no obvious special effects sequences, digital color manipulation is used throughout, and specific digital manipulations were used on about 350 shots. These manipulations often involved removing people and objects in backgrounds of scenes shot on Paris streets. The closeup of Dany Boon's face during Marconi's speech was out of focus when shot, but his performance was so good that Jeunet decided to digitally focus the face rather than reshooting. De Fenouillet's first appearance in his office was constructed entirely in post production from footage filmed for a different scene. Bazil, Buster, and Slammer were digitally removed from the frame, and De Fenouillet was given dialogue whose audio would synchronize exactly with the original lines filmed.

The character of Elastic Girl performs several contortions on screen which were not digital effects. Julie Ferrier, who played the character, is fairly flexible and did some of the movement herself. The difficult contortions were performed by Julia Gunthel, also known as Zlata. Jeunet and cinematographer Tetsuo Nagata had discovered Gunthel doing an erotic show in Germany.

Tiny Pete's moving sculptures were designed and built by sculptor Gilbert Peyre.

The film contains five appearances of the film's poster, usually hidden in quick shots.

Use of The Big Sleep
The film opens with the final sequence of The Big Sleep, with the original score by Max Steiner. Steiner's score is used throughout the film, but Jeunet also required original music. The music which appears is by Raphaël Beau, an unknown school teacher with no prior professional recording or scoring experience. Beau composed music cues for various scenes. Jeunet loved his music but moved the songs to different scenes in the final version of the film.

Planned scene
Jeunet also decided to reference his earlier film Amélie in the shot when Bazil first lowers his microphone into a chimney. The planned scene would show Amélie and Nino in a small apartment with several crying children. Amélie star Audrey Tautou was shooting Coco Before Chanel, and was unavailable to shoot the scene. The shot was replaced by an homage to Jeunet's Delicatessen. In the final scene, Dominique Pinon sits with Marie-Laure Dougnac and plays a musical saw.

Reception
According to Box Office Mojo, Micmacs grossed $16,331,174 in the worldwide box office. The review aggregator website Rotten Tomatoes reported a 74% approval rating with an average rating of 6.6/10 based on 133 reviews. Metacritic gave the film a score of 62 out of 100, based on 31 critics.

References

External links
 
 Official Facebook
 
 
 

2009 films
2000s fantasy comedy films
2000s French-language films
Films directed by Jean-Pierre Jeunet
French fantasy comedy films
Films shot in France
Films shot in Morocco
Films shot in Paris
Warner Bros. films
Sony Pictures Classics films
2009 comedy films
2000s French films